The Aborn Opera company was an American opera company that was active from 1895 through 1922.

History
Founded and operated by brothers Milton Aborn (1864–1933) and Sargent Aborn (1866–1956), the company was based out of New York City but spent most of its time on the road touring the United States. Milton was born in Marysville, California in 1864, and his brother Sargent was born in Boston, Massachusetts in 1866. They had been theater managers since 1885. From 1913 to 1915 they were managers at the Century Theatre in Manhattan.

From 1912 until 1915 Ralph Lyford conducted over 200 performances of operas with the company.

References

External links

New York City opera companies
Musical groups established in 1895
Musical groups disestablished in 1922
1895 establishments in New York City
1922 disestablishments in New York (state)